Red foxes pose a serious conservation problem in Australia. 2012 estimates indicate that there are more than 7.2 million red foxes (Vulpes vulpes) and growing with a range extending throughout most of the continental mainland. The species became established in Australia through successive introductions by settlers in 1830s. Due to its rapid spread and ecological impact it has classified as one of the most damaging invasive species in Australia.

Introduction and spread
Red foxes were introduced to the British colonies of Van Diemen's Land (as early as 1833) and the Port Phillip District and Sydney Regions of New South Wales (as early as 1845) for the purpose of the traditional English sport of fox hunting. Curiously a permanent fox population was not established on the island of Tasmania and it is widely held that they were outcompeted by the Tasmanian devil. On the mainland, however, the species was successful as an apex predator.  The spread of red foxes across the southern part of the continent has coincided with the spread of rabbits in Australia, another invasive species also introduced in the 19th century that is a key prey of the red fox.

Current distribution

Established populations of red fox are found in all states and are widespread throughout the country with the exception of tropical areas of northern Queensland, the Kimberley and the Top End of the Northern Territory.  From 2010, confirmed evidence of foxes in Tasmania has been reported by the state's Department of Primary Industries, Parks, Water and Environment. Foxes are found in ever higher concentrations in densely populated suburban areas and in large cities such as Melbourne.

It is generally less common in areas where the dingo is more prevalent; however, it has, primarily through its burrowing behaviour, achieved niche differentiation with both the feral dog and the feral cat.

Ecological impacts
The West Australian conservation department, CALM, estimates introduced predators are responsible for the extinction of ten native species in that state. Red foxes been directly implicated in the extinction and decline of populations of the family Potoroidae including the extinction of the desert rat-kangaroo.

The spread of the red fox population corresponds with declines in the distribution of several medium-sized ground-dwelling mammals, including brush-tailed bettongs, burrowing bettongs, rufous bettongs, bilbies, numbats, bridled nailtail wallabies and quokkas. Most of these species now only live in limited areas (such as islands) where red foxes are absent or rare. In 2016, researchers documented that some red foxes in Australia had learned to climb trees to look for baby koalas and other unsuspecting creatures such as gliders, dispelling the long-held belief that tree-dwelling creatures were safe from them.

On the contrary to above, some researchers argue that there could be benefits of feral foxes for suppressing the number of rats and rabbits or even feral cats, and eradication of foxes may harm native ecosystem indirectly.

Management and control

Local eradication programs exist, although eradication has proven difficult due to the denning behaviour and nocturnal hunting, so the focus is on management with the introduction of state bounties. Within smaller fenced reserves, eradicating feral cats and foxes can allow the reintroduction of extirpated mammal species. However, eradication can be very time-consuming and labour-intensive. At the Australian Wildlife Conservancy's Pilliga reserve, a red fox nicknamed Rambo evaded all attempts to trap, poison, or shoot him for four and a half years, delaying planned mammal reintroductions until the fox's presumed death in 2022.

The main form of control is baits, typically containing 1080 poison. Fox hunting is legal in all states and they are typically shot with the aid of spotlighting at night or attracted using fox whistles during the day. The eyeshine signature (from the tapetum lucidum in the eye) of foxes, and body shape and silhouette are used to identify them.

The reintroduction of competitive species has also been suggested as a method of control. Research by the CSIRO concluded that the presence of dingos not only decreases the presence of foxes but increases native fauna. Chris Johnson of James Cook University and Euan Ritchie of Deakin University have advocated the reintroduction of Tasmanian devils to the mainland to perform a similar role, as evidenced by the past eradication of foxes from Tasmania, as well as to ensure the ongoing survival of that native species.

Western Shield Program

Western Australian state government authorities conduct aerial and hand baiting on almost  to control foxes (and feral cats) as part of the Western Shield pest management program.

Fox Free Tasmania program
According to the Tasmanian government, red foxes were introduced to the previously fox-free island of Tasmania in 1999 or 2000, posing a significant threat to native wildlife, including the eastern bettong, and an eradication program conducted by the Tasmanian Department of Primary Industries and Water has been established. An independent member of the Tasmanian state Parliament, Ivan Dean, has claimed that the fox introductions are a hoax, a claim the Minister for Primary Industry, David Llewellyn described as a "load of rubbish".  Tasmania is estimated to have the carrying capacity to support a population of up to 300,000 foxes.

See also
Invasive species in Australia

References

Foxes
Invasive animal species in Australia
Foxes
Fauna naturalised in Australia